This is a list of bestselling novels in the United States in the 1900s, as determined by The Bookman, a New York-based literary journal. The list features the most popular novels of each year from 1900 through 1909.

The standards set for inclusion in the lists – which, for example, led to the exclusion of the novels in the Harry Potter series from the lists for the 1990s and 2000s – are currently unknown.

1900

 To Have and to Hold by Mary Johnston
 Red Pottage by Mary Cholmondeley
 Unleavened Bread by Robert Grant
 The Reign of Law by James Lane Allen
 Eben Holden by Irving Bacheller
 Janice Meredith by Paul Leicester Ford
 The Redemption of David Corson by Charles Frederic Goss
 Richard Carvel by Winston Churchill
 When Knighthood Was in Flower by Charles Major
 Alice of Old Vincennes by Maurice Thompson

1901
 The Crisis by Winston Churchill
 Alice of Old Vincennes by Maurice Thompson
 The Helmet of Navarre by Bertha Runkle
 The Right of Way by Gilbert Parker
 Eben Holden by Irving Bacheller
 The Visits of Elizabeth by Elinor Glyn
 The Puppet Crown by Harold MacGrath
 The Life and Death of Richard Yea-and-Nay by Maurice Hewlett
 Graustark by George Barr McCutcheon
 D'ri and I by Irving Bacheller

1902

 The Virginian by Owen Wister
 Mrs. Wiggs of the Cabbage Patch by Alice Caldwell Hegan (Alice Hegan Rice)
 Dorothy Vernon of Haddon Hall by Charles Major
 The Mississippi Bubble by Emerson Hough
 Audrey by Mary Johnston
 The Right of Way by Gilbert Parker
 The Hound of the Baskervilles by Arthur Conan Doyle
 The Two Vanrevels by Booth Tarkington
 The Blue Flower by Henry van Dyke
 Sir Richard Calmady by Lucas Malet

1903
 Lady Rose's Daughter by Mary Augusta Ward
 Gordon Keith by Thomas Nelson Page
 The Pit by Frank Norris
 Lovey Mary by Alice Hegan Rice
 The Virginian by Owen Wister
 Mrs. Wiggs of the Cabbage Patch by Alice Hegan Rice
 The Mettle of the Pasture by James Lane Allen
 Letters of a Self-Made Merchant to His Son by George Horace Lorimer
 The One Woman by Thomas Dixon, Jr.
 The Little Shepherd of Kingdom Come by John Fox, Jr.

1904
 The Crossing by Winston Churchill
 The Deliverance by Ellen Glasgow
 The Masquerader by Katherine Cecil Thurston
 In the Bishop's Carriage by Miriam Michelson
 Sir Mortimer by Mary Johnston
 Beverly of Graustark by George Barr McCutcheon
 The Little Shepherd of Kingdom Come by John Fox, Jr.
 Rebecca of Sunnybrook Farm by Kate Douglas Wiggin
 My Friend Prospero by Henry Harland
 The Silent Places by Stewart Edward White

1905
 The Marriage of William Ashe by Mary Augusta Ward
 Sandy by Alice Hegan Rice
 The Garden of Allah by Robert Hichens
 The Clansman by Thomas Dixon, Jr.
 Nedra by George Barr McCutcheon
 The Gambler by Katherine Cecil Thurston
 The Masquerader by Katherine Cecil Thurston
 The House of Mirth by Edith Wharton
 The Princess Passes by C. N. Williamson and A. M. Williamson
 Rose o' the River by Kate Douglas Wiggin

1906

 Coniston by Winston Churchill
 Lady Baltimore by Owen Wister
 The Fighting Chance by Robert W. Chambers
 The House of a Thousand Candles by Meredith Nicholson
 Jane Cable by George Barr McCutcheon
 The Jungle by Upton Sinclair
 The Awakening of Helena Richie by Margaret Deland
 The Spoilers by Rex Beach
 The House of Mirth by Edith Wharton
 The Wheel of Life by Ellen Glasgow

1907
 The Lady of the Decoration by Frances Little
 The Weavers by Gilbert Parker
 The Port of Missing Men by Meredith Nicholson
 The Shuttle by Frances Hodgson Burnett
 The Brass Bowl by Louis Joseph Vance
 Satan Sanderson by Hallie Erminie Rives
 The Daughter of Anderson Crow by George Barr McCutcheon
 The Younger Set by Robert W. Chambers
 The Doctor by Ralph Connor
 Half a Rogue by Harold MacGrath

1908
 Mr. Crewe's Career by Winston Churchill
 The Barrier by Rex Beach
 The Trail of the Lonesome Pine by John Fox, Jr.
 The Lure of the Mask by Harold MacGrath
 The Shuttle by Frances Hodgson Burnett
 Peter by F. Hopkinson Smith
 Lewis Rand by Mary Johnston
 The Black Bag by Louis Joseph Vance
 The Man from Brodney's by George Barr McCutcheon
 The Weavers by Gilbert Parker

1909
 The Inner Shrine by Anonymous (Basil King)
 Katrine by Elinor Macartney Lane
 The Silver Horde by Rex Beach
 The Man in Lower Ten by Mary Roberts Rinehart
 The Trail of the Lonesome Pine by John Fox, Jr.
 Truxton King by George Barr McCutcheon
 54-40 or Fight by Emerson Hough
 The Goose Girl by Harold MacGrath
 Peter by F. Hopkinson Smith
 Septimus by William J. Locke

References 

1900s in the United States
Novels
1900s books